Herpetopoma alacerrimum is a species of sea snail, a marine gastropod mollusk in the family Chilodontidae.

Distribution
This marine species occurs off New Zealand.

References

External links
 To Encyclopedia of Life
 To World Register of Marine Species

alacerrimum
Gastropods described in 1956